Potassium sulfate (US) or potassium sulphate (UK), also called sulphate of potash (SOP), arcanite, or archaically potash of sulfur, is the inorganic compound with formula K2SO4, a white water-soluble solid. It is commonly used in fertilizers, providing both potassium and sulfur.

History
Potassium sulfate (K2SO4) has been known since early in the 14th century.  It was studied by Glauber, Boyle, and Tachenius. In the 17th century, it was named arcanuni or sal duplicatum, as it was a combination of an acid salt with an alkaline salt. It was also known as vitriolic tartar and Glaser's salt or sal polychrestum Glaseri after the pharmaceutical chemist Christopher Glaser who prepared it and used medicinally.

Known as arcanum duplicatum ("double secret") or panacea duplicata in pre-modern medicine, it was prepared from the residue (caput mortuum) left over from the production of aqua fortis (nitric acid, HNO3) from nitre (potassium nitrate, KNO3) and oil of vitriol (sulphuric acid, H2SO4) via Glauber's process:
2 KNO3 + H2SO4 → 2 HNO3 + K2SO4
The residue was dissolved in hot water, filtered, and evaporated to a cuticle. It was then left to crystallise. It was used as a diuretic and sudorific.

According to Chambers's Cyclopedia, the recipe was purchased for five hundred thalers by Charles Frederick, Duke of Holstein-Gottorp. Schroder, the duke's physician, wrote wonders of its great uses in hypochondriacal cases, continued and intermitting fevers, stone, scurvy, and more.

Natural resources
The mineral form of potassium sulfate, arcanite, is relatively rare. Natural resources of potassium sulfate are minerals abundant in the Stassfurt salt. These are cocrystallizations of potassium sulfate and sulfates of magnesium, calcium, and sodium.

Relevant minerals are:
Kainite, KMg(SO4)·Cl·3H2O
Schönite (now known as picromerite), K2SO4·MgSO4·6H2O
Leonite, K2SO4·MgSO4·4H2O
Langbeinite, K2Mg2(SO4)3
Aphthitalite (previously known as glaserite), K3Na(SO4)2
Polyhalite, K2SO4·MgSO4·2CaSO4·2H2O

The potassium sulfate can be separated from some of these minerals, like kainite, because the corresponding salt is less soluble in water.

Kieserite, MgSO4·H2O, can be combined with a solution of potassium chloride to produce potassium sulfate.

Production
Approximately 1.5 million tons were produced in 1985, typically by the reaction of potassium chloride with sulfuric acid, analogous to the Mannheim process for producing sodium sulfate.  The process involves intermediate formation of potassium bisulfate, an exothermic reaction that occurs at room temperature:
KCl  +  H2SO4   →  HCl  +  KHSO4
The second step of the process is endothermic, requiring energy input:
KCl  +  KHSO4  →  HCl  +  K2SO4

Structure and properties
Two crystalline forms are known.  Orthorhombic β-K2SO4 is the common form, but it converts to α-K2SO4 above 583 °C. These structures are complex, although the sulfate adopts the typical tetrahedral geometry.

It does not form a hydrate, unlike sodium sulfate.  The salt crystallizes as double six-sided pyramids, classified as rhombic. They are transparent, very hard and have a bitter, salty taste. The salt is soluble in water, but insoluble in solutions of potassium hydroxide (sp. gr. 1.35), or in absolute ethanol.

Uses
The dominant use of potassium sulfate is as a fertilizer. K2SO4 does not contain chloride, which can be harmful to some crops. Potassium sulfate is preferred for these crops, which include tobacco and some fruits and vegetables. Crops that are less sensitive may still require potassium sulfate for optimal growth if the soil accumulates chloride from irrigation water.

The crude salt is also used occasionally in the manufacture of glass. Potassium sulfate is also used as a flash reducer in artillery propellant charges. It reduces muzzle flash, flareback and blast overpressure.

It is sometimes used as an alternative blast media similar to soda in soda blasting as it is harder and similarly water-soluble.

Potassium sulfate can also be used in pyrotechnics in combination with potassium nitrate to generate a purple flame.

A 5% solution of potassium sulfate was used in the beginning of the 20th century as a topical mosquito repellent.

Reactions

Acidification
Potassium hydrogen sulfate (also known as potassium bisulfate), KHSO4, is readily produced by reacting K2SO4 with sulfuric acid. The solution behaves much as if its two congeners, K2SO4 and H2SO4, were present side by side of each other uncombined; an excess of ethanol the precipitates normal sulfate (with little bisulfate) with excess acid remaining.

The behavior of the fused dry salt is similar when heated to several hundred degrees; it acts on silicates, titanates, etc., the same way as sulfuric acid that is heated beyond its natural boiling point does. Hence it is frequently used in analytical chemistry as a disintegrating agent. For information about other salts that contain sulfate, see sulfate.

References

External links
mindat.org: Arcanite
webmineral: Arcanite

Potassium compounds
Sulfates
Inorganic fertilizers
E-number additives